Paddle crab may refer to:

Charybdis japonica, the Asian paddle crab
Ovalipes catharus, the New Zealand paddle crab